The 2016 Coca-Cola 600, the 57th running of the event, was a NASCAR Sprint Cup Series race held on May 29, 2016 at Charlotte Motor Speedway in Concord, North Carolina. Contested over 400 laps on the 1.5 mile (2.42 km) asphalt speedway, it was the thirteenth race of the 2016 NASCAR Sprint Cup season. The race had nine lead changes among four different drivers and four cautions for 19 laps.

Report

Background

The race was held at Charlotte Motor Speedway, which is located in Concord, North Carolina. The speedway complex includes a  quad-oval track that will be utilized for the race, as well as a dragstrip and a dirt track. The speedway was built in 1959 by Bruton Smith and is considered the home track for NASCAR with many race teams based in the Charlotte metropolitan area. The track is owned and operated by Speedway Motorsports Inc. (SMI) with Marcus G. Smith serving as track president.

Entry list
The initial entry list for the race was released on May 23, 2016 at 8:54 am ET with forty cars.

First practice

Qualifying

He said after qualifying that he "liked what I felt last year and I’ve been thinking about this race a lot since then. We had a really good car that day and thought we were going to go to victory lane and got beat on fuel mileage. Just excited for all my guys and for Bass Pro Shops, Tracker Boats, Furniture Row, Denver Mattress and everybody that works so hard on this deal – Toyota Racing, TRD – just awesome race cars. We had to work hard today, we were not that good in practice and made a lot of changes throughout this qualifying session. Hats off to my guys for some really good work and lucky to be with this group for sure.”

Joey Logano, who qualified second, said he "got a little bit tight landing in (Turn) 1 and then a little bit free off (the corner). It wasn't much. And then (Turns) 3 and 4, I actually thought was a pretty good corner. So I would say most of it was down in 1 and 2 – probably at landing and through the center is where I lost most of my momentum. It's not much. Half-a-tenth of a second doesn't take long."

“Being in the top four in every session there was really big for us,” Ricky Stenhouse Jr. said after qualifying third. “We’ve been fast at times in qualifying, but never put every round together and stayed that consistent, so I’m really proud of the team for the adjustments that they made throughout the qualifying session there. We just missed it a little bit, but we know where to go work on it to get it better. Now our job is to get it better on Saturday for a long 600 miles and make sure that we’ve got some adjustability in it.”

Qualifying results

Practice (post-qualifying)

Second practice

Final practice

Race

First half

Start
Under cloudy North Carolina skies, Martin Truex Jr. led the field to the green flag at 6:12 p.m. The first caution of the race flew on lap 26. This was a scheduled competition caution due to overnight rain. Ryan Blaney and Chase Elliott were tagged for speeding on pit road and restarted the race from the tail-end of the field.

The race restarted at lap 31. Truex hit pit road on lap 78 and handed the lead to Jimmie Johnson. He pitted the next lap and the lead cycled back to Truex.

Second quarter
The second caution of the race flew on lap 114 for a single-car spin in turn 2. Rounding the turn, Brian Scott got loose and spun down the track.

The race restarted on lap 121. David Ragan was tagged for a restart violation and was forced to serve a pass-through penalty. Truex pitted from the lead on lap 165 and handed the lead to Johnson. He pitted the next lap and handed the lead to Joey Logano, who pitted the following lap as well, with the lead cycling back to Truex. Ragan was tagged for an uncontrolled tire and was forced to serve a pass-through penalty.

Second half

Halfway
Reed Sorenson retired from the race due to clutch issues and finished 40th. The third caution of the race flew on lap 204 for a single-car wreck in turn 4. Rounding the turn, Jeffrey Earnhardt got loose and slammed the wall.

The race restarted on lap 210. During the green flag cycle of stops on lap 266, Logano was tagged for his crew being over the wall too soon and was forced to serve a pass-through penalty. Logano said after the race that his team, and others, are "trying to make pit stops so fast and you’re gonna push everything to the edge. I guess we jumped off the wall a little bit too soon. I haven’t seen it, but unfortunately, that kind of made us make a green flag pit stop, which is really hard to overcome. Overall, we were able to get our lap back by racing up there, which was kind of cool. We didn’t have to take a lucky dog or any of that. We actually raced back to the lead lap, but we lost the balance a little bit on the last run and I couldn’t make much time once we got going."

Truex pitted on lap 299 and handed the lead to Paul Menard. He pitted on lap 302 and the lead cycled back to Truex. Carl Edwards was tagged for speeding and was forced to serve a pass-through penalty. He was tagged for speeding again while serving the penalty and was forced to serve a stop and go penalty.

Fourth quarter
With 85 laps to go, Truex began running into lapped traffic. This allowed Johnson to pull up to within three-tenths of a second of him. He was unable to get past Truex and lost second to Kevin Harvick. Debris on the backstretch brought out the fourth caution of the race with 61 laps to go, within the fuel window allowing the entire field to reach the scheduled distance on one more full tank of fuel. In the ensuing caution, Aric Almirola was tagged for speeding on pit road and restarted the race from the tail-end of the field.

The race restarted with 56 laps to go. Johnson briefly took the lead from Truex after the restart, but Truex quickly reclaimed the lead and then led the remainder of the race, ultimately leading a race-record 392 of the 400 laps en route to the victory. Truex's average speed (160.655 miles per hour) was also an all-time record for the race and the race was also the shortest Coca-Cola/World 600 in the history of the event at just 3 hours, 44 minutes, and 8 seconds.

Post-race

Driver comments
Truex said afterwards that he was "proud of my team, everybody that made this possible, that believed in me, gave me this opportunity. Cole Pearn (crew chief), Jazzy (team engineer Jeff Curtis), my guys are something special. I want to thank all of them. This is a big day. Got the troops on the cars, this is a special weekend. It’s really neat to bring that name home to Victory Lane. Just a lot of emotion right now. Not really sure it’s sunk in yet. Just an amazing day, an amazing weekend for all of us. It’s a weekend you dream about."

After a runner-up finish, Harvick said he "ran 10th all day. So I’m just really, really happy. When you’re able to take a 10th-place car – at best – and drive it 450 miles and then make huge gains (the rest of the way). At the end of the race we obviously didn’t have the best car. Those guys (Truex’s Furniture Row Racing team) have had some fast cars this year and tonight definitely had the dominant car. Early on we were just really bad. Tight coming into corners and loose coming out. Nothing seemed to be working and then were just stepped back and swung for the fences. We were able to pass with our car once we got our handling together. The cars were already sliding around a fair amount all day.”

Johnson said after finishing third that he was "so proud of the effort we put in tonight. This is the best car I’ve had in Charlotte for a long time. It just shows you how good that No. 78 was and the No. 4 got a little bit better than us at the end. I thought we had a chance at them a few times, a couple of times on the long run we would get close. A couple times on the restarts we would get close, but all-in-all a very strong performance for this Lowe’s Chevrolet. Very proud of the team work and the support that we have from all the employees at Lowe’s. Just came up a little short today.” He also said that Truex "was very impressive. I’m happy for Martin and the team, those guys have worked awful hard to get where they’re at.”

Race results

Race summary
 Lead changes: 9 among 4 different drivers
 Cautions/laps: 4 for 19
 Red flags: 0
 Time of race: 3 hours, 44 minutes and 5 seconds
 Average speed:

Media

Television
Fox Sports televised the race in the United States for the sixteenth consecutive year. Mike Joy was the lap-by-lap announcer, while three-time Coca-Cola 600 winner, Jeff Gordon and five-time race winner Darrell Waltrip were the color commentators. Jamie Little, Chris Neville, Vince Welch and Matt Yocum reported from pit lane during the race.

Radio
Radio coverage of the race was broadcast by the Performance Racing Network (PRN), and was simulcasted on Sirius XM NASCAR Radio. Doug Rice, Mark Garrow and Wendy Venturini called the race in the booth when the field raced through the quad-oval. Rob Albright reported the race from a billboard in turn 2 when the field was racing through turns 1 and 2 and halfway down the backstretch. Pat Patterson called the race from a billboard outside of turn 3 when the field raced through the other half of the backstretch and through turns 3 and 4. Brad Gillie, Brett McMillan, Jim Noble and Steve Richards were the pit reporters during the broadcast.

Standings after the race

Note: Only the first 16 positions are included for the driver standings.. – Driver has clinched a Chase position.

References

Coca-Cola 600
Coca-Cola 600
NASCAR races at Charlotte Motor Speedway
Coca-Cola 600